Pat Ryan may refer to:

Sportspeople

Hurlers
 Pat Ryan (Borris–Ileigh hurler) (born 1958), Irish hurler for Tipperary
 Pat Ryan (Cork hurler) (born 1976), Irish hurler
 Pat Ryan (Limerick hurler) (born 1995), Irish hurler
 Pat Ryan (Moycarkey-Borris hurler) (born 1938), Irish hurler for Tipperary

Other sports
 Patrick Ryan (athlete) (1881–1964), first holder of the World Hammer Record
 Pat Ryan (American football) (born 1955), American football quarterback
 Pat Ryan (Australian footballer) (1886–1937), Australian rules footballer
 Pat Ryan (boxer) (1952–2013), New Zealand boxer
 Pat Ryan (curler) (born 1955), Canadian curler
 Pat Ryan (rugby union) (1950–1985), New Zealand rugby union player

Other people
 Pat Ryan (artist), American poster artist
 Pat Ryan, maiden name of Pat Nixon (1912–1993), First Lady of the United States
 Pat Ryan (executive) (born 1937/38), founder and executive chairman of Aon Corporation
 R. L. Ryan (1946–1991), American actor, sometimes billed as Pat Ryan
 Pat Ryan (politician) (born 1982), American politician
 Pat Ryan, fictional journalist and man of action in the comic strip Terry and the Pirates (1934–1973)

See also 
 Patrick Ryan (disambiguation)
 Patricia Ryan (disambiguation)